Philippe Rahm (born 1967) Dipl. EPFL - Ecole Polytechnique Fédérale de Lausanne - Switzerland 1993 is a principal architect in the office of Philippe Rahm architectes, based in Paris, France. His work, which extends the field of architecture from the physiological scale of the body to the climatic scale of the city has received an international audience in the context of sustainability.

Biography 

In 2002, Rahm was chosen to represent Switzerland at the 8th Architectural Venice Biennale in Italy. He was also one of twenty international architects selected for the 2008 Venice Biennale, which was curated by Aaron Betsky.

He has participated in a number of exhibitions worldwide, including (Archilab, Orléans, France 2000; SF-MoMA 2001; CCA Kitakyushu 2004; Centre Pompidou, Paris, 2003–2006 and 2007; Manifesta 7, 2008; Louisiana museum, Denmark, 2009; Guggenheim Museum, New-York 2010). In 2007, he had a personal exhibition at the Canadian Centre for Architecture in Montreal. Mr. Rahm was a resident at the Villa Medici in Rome (2000). Since 2005, he has been a member of the Artistic Council of the Foundation Prince Pierre in Monaco. He has lectured widely, including at Cooper Union, Harvard School of Design, Bartlett School of Architecture UCL, UCLA and the ETH Zürich. He has worked on several private and public projects in France, England, Italy and Germany. His recent work includes in 2010 the project of an office building of 13000 m2 in La Défense in France for the EPADESA; convective apartments for the IBA in Hamburg, Germany; the White geology, a stage design for contemporary art in the Grand-Palais on the Champs-Elysées in Paris in 2009; and a studio house for the artist Dominique Gonzalez-Foerster in 2008.

Academic experience 
He was Headmaster at the AA School of Architecture in London in 2005-2006, Visiting professor in Mendrisio Academy of Architecture in Switzerland in 2004 and 2005, at the ETH Lausanne in 2006 and 2007, at the School of Architecture of the Royal Danish Academy of Fine Arts of Copenhagen in 2009-2010, in Oslo at the AHO in 2010-2011. He was visiting professor at School of Architecture of Princeton University, USA, from 2011 to 2013. In the Fall 2011 semester, Philippe was the Michale Fellow at the University at Buffalo - State University of New York.He was a visiting professor in BiArch ( Barcelona Institute Of Architecture) for 2011-12 MBiArch program. He starts to teach Architectural design at the Graduate School of Design in Harvard in 2014. He is a tenured teacher at the ENSAV, national school of architecture of Versailles in France.

Awards 
In 2011, Rahm won the international competition with mosbach paysagistes for the Jade Eco Park, a 70 hectares park in Taichung, Taiwan, which opened to the public in December 2020. In 2019, together with OMA, he won the urban planning competition for Farini (44 hectares) and San Cristoforo (15 hectares) in Milan.

Further reading 
 2002, « Architecture physiologique » Décosterd & Rahm, Birkhauser, Basel, Boston, Berlin, .
 2004, « Ghostscape » Monum, ENSBA, Paris, .
 2005, « Distorsions », HYX éditeurs, Orléans, France, .
 2005, « Ghost flat », Philippe Rahm, Marie Darrieussecq, CCA Kitakyushu, Japan.
 2006, « Environ(ne)ment : approaches for tomorrow», Gilles Clément, Philippe Rahm, Skira, Milan, Italie, .
 2009, « Architecture météorologique », Archibooks, Paris, France, .
 2010, « Typologies météorologique », Am weissenhof Galerie, Stuttgart, Allemagne.
 2014, « Constructed Atmospheres », Postmediabooks, Paris, France, .
 2015, « Météorologie des sentiments», Les Petits matins, Paris, France, .
 2017, « Form follows climate», Oil Forest League, Italy, 
 2019, « Le jardin météorologique, et autres constructions climatiques», Editions B2, Paris, France, 
 2020, « Arquitectura Meteorológica» , Editor Arquine, Mexico, 
 2020, « Écrits climatiques », Éditions B2, France, 
 2020, « Histoire naturelle de l'architecture », Éditions du Pavillon de l'Arsenal, France, 
 2021, « Escritos climáticos », Puente Editores, Spain, .
 2022, « Meteorología de los sentimientos », Ediciones Asimétricas, Spain, .

References

External links 
 https://web.archive.org/web/20140728074226/http://www.gsd.harvard.edu/cgi-bin/courses/faculty.cgi?term=201420&person=156856
 
 The Harvard's lecture
 The ETH Zürich lecture
 The New-York lecture

Swiss architects
1967 births
Living people
Knights of the Order of Cultural Merit (Monaco)